Rogério Bertani is a Brazilian arachnologist, active at the Butantan Institute.

He is credited as one of the foremost specialists in Theraphosidae in the world. He has described several species.

References

21st-century Brazilian zoologists
Brazilian arachnologists
Living people
Year of birth missing (living people)